Pilar Marie Victoriá López (born October 11, 1995) is a Puerto Rican volleyball player. She played college volleyball for the Texas Longhorns and the Arkansas Razorbacks.

Career
She has competed for the Puerto Rico women's national volleyball team as well as the Puerto Rico Youth National Team and the Puerto Rico Junior National Team. In 2010, she won the bronze medal while competing with the Puerto Rico Youth National Team at the 2010 NORCECA Youth Championship in Guatemala. She has named it as one of her most memorable achievements. In 2015, she became one of the preeminent offensive players in the nation as an outside hitter for the Arkansas Razorbacks.

She participated in the 2015 FIVB Volleyball World Grand Prix, and the 2016 FIVB Volleyball World Grand Prix.

Early life 
Victoriá played volleyball for the Notre Dame High School Knights, where she was a four-time All-Star in the Puerto Rico High School Athletic Alliance and led her team to four consecutive league championships.

College career 
Victoria started her college career playing for the Texas Longhorns. She helped her team advance to the Final Four of the NCAA Division I Women's Volleyball Championship in both 2013 and 2014. In 2015, she transferred to the University of Arkansas, where she quickly established herself as the team's main offensive threat and one of the premier offensive players in the nation. On September 23, 2015, she had 30 kills in a 5-set win against LSU. On October 18, 2015, she recorded 35 kills in a 5-set loss against Ole Miss, which represents the second-highest in a single match in Arkansas history. On October 30, 2015, Victoria registered 32 kills in a 5-set win against Auburn. Her 525 total kills ranked first in the SEC conference and 13th in the nation, while her 4.61 kills per set also ranked first in the SEC and 10th in the nation. She was named to the All-SEC Team and to the AVCA All-Region South Team

References

External links
 Profile at FIVB.org

1995 births
Living people
Expatriate volleyball players in the United States
People from Caguas, Puerto Rico
Puerto Rican women's volleyball players
Wing spikers
Texas Longhorns women's volleyball players
Arkansas Razorbacks women's volleyball players